Zator  (Wymysorys: Naojśtaod) is an old town on the Skawa river within Oświęcim County, Lesser Poland Voivodeship (since 1999) in southern Poland. From 1975 to 1998 it belonged to the Bielsko-Biała Voivodeship. It is the administrative seat of the Gmina Zator. According to data from December 31, 2008, Zator was inhabited by 4779 people.

Description
The city, located on the Skawa river, is well known for pisciculture, especially carp, and periodic event called Zatorskie Dni Karpia. Zator is the main city of the Carp Valley.

History
Originally a part of Lesser Poland, the area was acquired by the Silesian Piast Duke Władysław of Opole by a 1274 agreement with the Polish Princeps Bolesław V the Chaste. Zator then belonged to the Upper Silesian Duchy of Opole and after Władysław's death in 1281 fell to the Duchy of Cieszyn. It received town privileges in 1292.

From 1315 on Zator belonged to the Duchy of Oświęcim split off Cieszyn and in 1445 even became the capital of a Piast duchy in its own right, the Duchy of Zator under Duke Wenceslaus I, a Bohemian vassal. It finally fell back to the Kingdom of Poland, when in 1494 Wenceslaus' son Jan V sold his lands to King John I Albert.

From 1564 Zator had been incorporated into the Kraków Voivodeship of Lesser Poland; in the course of the 1772 First Partition of Poland it was annexed by the Habsburg monarchy under Empress Maria Theresa of Austria and incorporated into the Austrian Kingdom of Galicia and Lodomeria. After the dissolution of Austria-Hungary by the 1919 Treaty of Saint-Germain Zator again fell to Poland.

During the World War II, Zator was incorporated to Nazi Germany as a part of the Province of Upper Silesia, and was liberated on January 26, 1945.
Several hundred Jews lived in Zator. Most of them were murdered in the Holocaust.

Places of interest
 The Zator castle, actually a palace, originally of defensive purposes. The castle is from 1445 year. It is classified as The First Class Monument. In 1836, it was completely renovated by The Potocki family according to the project of F. M. Lanci.
 The Jewish cemetery, founded in the middle of the 19th century. There are about 50 preserved headstones, most of which with an inscription in Hebrew language.
 The Energylandia amusement park is located in Zator.

Notable people
 Roman Rybarski (1887–1942), economist and politician
 Rose Meth (1925-2013), surviving participant of the October 7, 1944 Sonderkommando uprising at the Auschwitz-Birkenau concentration camp

International relations

Twin towns — Sister cities
Zator is twinned with:
  Berekfürdő, Hungary
  Bojnice, Slovakia

References

External links
  Serwis Internetowy Miasta i Gminy Zator
  Stowarzyszenie Dolina Karpia
  The illustrated article about the castle in Zator
 Jewish Community in Zator on Virtual Shtetl

Cities and towns in Lesser Poland Voivodeship
Oświęcim County
Lesser Poland
Kraków Voivodeship (14th century – 1795)
Kingdom of Galicia and Lodomeria
Kraków Voivodeship (1919–1939)
Jewish communities destroyed in the Holocaust